The 2019 Libera Awards took place on June 20, 2019. Presented by the American Association of Independent Music, it recognized the best in independent music during a ceremony at New York City's Ziegfeld Ballroom.

The ceremony was hosted by comedian Chris Gethard and featured performances by Deva Mahal, Sunflower Bean, and Jean-Michel Blais.

This was the first year where there were three categories for Label of the Year as opposed to two; Small (5 or fewer employees), Medium (6-14 employees), and Big (15 or more employees).

Winners and nominees 
Adapted from Libera Awards.

Special awards 
A2IM Lifetime Achievement Award
 Jonathan Poneman, co-founder of Sub Pop

References

External links 
Official website

2020 music awards
Libera Awards